Millennium Hotel may refer to any of several hotels operated by Millennium & Copthorne Hotels, including:

United States
Millennium Alaskan Hotel, Anchorage, US
Millennium Biltmore Hotel, Los Angeles, US
Millennium Hotel St. Louis, US
Millennium Hilton New York One UN Plaza, New York City, US
Millennium Downtown New York Hotel, New York City, US (owned by Hilton Worldwide)
Millennium Times Square New York

Other countries
Millennium Hotel Mayfair, London, UK
Millennium Madejski Hotel, Reading, UK
Millennium Hotel Taichung, Taiwan
Grand Millennium Hotel, one of the tallest buildings in Amman, Jordan